A gun moll is the female companion of a male professional criminal.

Gun moll may also refer to: 
 Gang Smashers, 1938 American film also released under the name Gun Moll
 Sex Pot (1975 film), Italian film  also released under the name Gun Moll